Pope Innocent XII (r. 1691–1700) created 30 cardinals in four consistories.

December 12, 1695
Innocent named twelve cardinals at his first consistory and reserved the names of two more in pectore.
 Giacomo Antonio Morigia, in pectore, announced 19 December 1998
 Sebastiano Antonio Tanara
 Giacomo Boncompagni
 Giovanni Giacomo Cavallerini
 Federico Caccia
 Taddeo Luigi dal Verme
 Baldassare Cenci (seniore), in pectore, announced 12 November
 Tommaso Maria Ferrari
 Giuseppe Sacripante
 Celestino Sfondrati
 Enrico Noris
 Giambattista Spinola, iuniore
 Domenico Tarugi
 Henri Albert de la Grange d'Arquien

July 22, 1697

 Luiz de Sousa
 Giorgio Cornaro
 Pierre-Armand du Camboust de Coislin
 Fabrizio Paolucci
 Alfonso Aguilar Fernández de Córdoba
 Vincenzo Grimani

November 14, 1699

 Niccolò Radulovich
 Giuseppe Archinto
 Andrea Santacroce
 Marcello d'Aste
 Daniello Marco Delfino
 Sperello Sperelli
 Giovanni Maria Gabrielli

June 21, 1700

 Louis Antoine de Noailles
 Johannes Philipp von Lamberg
 Francisco Antonio de Borja-Centelles y Ponce de León

References

Additional sources

Innocent XII
College of Cardinals
17th-century Catholicism